FIGMA or Finnish Games and Multimedia Association was founded in 1999. It is the Finnish equivalent to Entertainment Software Rating Board. Which regulates video game content in relation to subjects such as sex and violence and assigns age appropriate certificates.

Figma publishes  the best-selling video games every two weeks, and gives out platinum and gold prizes, its keeps yearly statistics on the size of the Finnish video game market, and organizes the Finnish Game Awards.

References

Arts and media trade groups
Censorship in Finland
Entertainment rating organizations
Organizations established in 1999
Video game content ratings systems
Video game organizations
Video game trade associations
1999 establishments in Finland
Organisations based in Helsinki